The canton of Berg-Helvie is an administrative division of the Ardèche department, southern France. It was created at the French canton reorganisation which came into effect in March 2015. Its seat is in Le Teil.

It consists of the following communes:
 
Alba-la-Romaine
Aubignas
Berzème
Darbres
Lavilledieu
Lussas
Mirabel
Saint-Andéol-de-Berg
Saint-Germain
Saint-Gineys-en-Coiron
Saint-Jean-le-Centenier
Saint-Laurent-sous-Coiron
Saint-Maurice-d'Ibie
Saint-Pons
Saint-Thomé
Sceautres
Le Teil
Valvignères
Villeneuve-de-Berg

References

Cantons of Ardèche